Symphony No. 1 in D major may refer to:

 Symphony No. 1 (Haydn)
 Symphony No. 1 (Mahler)
 Symphony No. 1 (Prokofiev)
 Symphony No. 1 (Schubert)